The defending champions are Martin Kližan and Igor Zelenay, but Kližan decided to compete in the 2013 Internazionali BNL d'Italia instead.
Christopher Kas and Oliver Marach defeated Nicholas Monroe and Simon Stadler 2–6, 6–4, [10–1] in the final to win the title.

Seeds

Draw

Draw

References

BNP Paribas Primrose Bordeauxandnbsp;- Doubles
2013 Doubles